Malaysia was affected by the 2004 Indian Ocean earthquake and tsunami on 26 December 2004. Despite its proximity to the epicentre of the earthquake, Malaysia escaped the kind of damage that struck countries hundreds of miles further away. Since the epicentre was on the western coast of Sumatra, the island largely protected the country from the worst of the tsunami. The country's worst affected areas were the northern coastal areas and outlying islands like Penang and Langkawi. The simple red flag warning system used by lifeguards on beaches in some resort areas in Penang was credited to reducing the number of fatalities.

The number of deaths currently stands at 67 with 52 in Penang, 12 in Kedah, 2 in Perak and 1 in Selangor. The deaths at Penang were reported to include many picnickers and children who were playing on open public beaches. No deaths were reported among foreign tourists. Houses in fishing villages along coastal areas were damaged in Batu Ferringhi and Balik Pulau in Penang. Coastal areas in Peninsular Malaysia e.g. 13 villages in Kuala Muda, Kedah and Kuala Triang in Langkawi island were also affected. About a quarter of holiday vessels anchored in Rebak and Telaga harbour in Langkawi were also damaged. The waves sent parked motorcycles crashing and cars washed with mud at stretches along Gurney Drive in George Town, Penang. The biggest loss from a single family was when five of Zulkifli Mohamad Noor's seven children were killed when the tsunami struck at Pasir Panjang beach.  Sinkholes which were reported in Kampar and Ipoh for three days running have been investigated and determined not to be earthquake related. It was disaster for the people there on that day.

Aftermath 

The Prime Minister, Dato' Seri Abdullah Ahmad Badawi, cut short his holiday in Spain after five days of the diplomatic trip to India and returned to Malaysia. He instructed the government to cancel all New Year celebrations and urged all parties, including the private sector, to hold prayers and remembrance services instead. The government also postponed the deportation of illegal immigrants and extended an amnesty so that they may exit the country by 31 January 2005 instead of 31 December 2004. It was announced that MYR 1,000 (US$260) would be given to the families of victims while MYR 200 (US$50) would be paid to those who had sustained injuries from the tsunami. Displaced residents would be given MYR 200 to alleviate their hardship, MYR 2,000 for every house damaged, and MYR 5,000 for every destroyed house. Fishermen whose boats were lost would be given MYR 1,000 for smaller boats and MYR 3,000 for larger boats.

References

External links 
 Tsunami in Penang Malaysia, video taken on 26 December (WMV file)
 The only Online Neighbourhood Community with an organised and central Tsunami Aid Programme
 Tsunami Disaster in Malaysia : Missing persons and updates
 Tsunami Tragedy Updates
 Visit to Kota Kuala Muda
 Tsunami Aftermath in Penang
 Statistics of Tsunami Aftermath

Malaysia
Tsunamis in Malaysia
2004 in Malaysia